Walk a Mile in My Shoes: The Essential '70s Masters is a five-disc box set compilation of the recorded work of Elvis Presley during the decade of the 1970s. It was released in 1995 by RCA Records, catalog number 66670-2, following similar box sets that covered his musical output in the 1950s and 1960s. This set's initial long-box release included a set of collectable stamps duplicating the record jackets of the LP albums on which the tracks in the box set were originally released by RCA. It also includes a booklet with an extensive session list and discography, as well as a lengthy essay by Dave Marsh, some of it excerpted from his 1982 book on Presley. The box set was certified gold by the Recording Industry Association of America on July 15, 1999.

Contents
The first two discs present the A and b sides of every single released in the United States by Presley during the decade, with the following exceptions: "Kentucky Rain" backed with "My Little Friend," and the b-side to "The Wonder of You," "Mama Liked the Roses," recorded in the 1960s; the gospel single "He Touched Me" b/w "Bosom of Abraham," and the gospel b-sides respectively to the singles "Life" and "If You Talk in Your Sleep," "Only Believe" and "Help Me," all four tracks already included on his first gospel compilation; and "Merry Christmas Baby" b/w "O Come All Ye Faithful", although the album version of the single can be found on disc four. His final two singles issued posthumously, the #22 "My Way" b/w "America the Beautiful" from November 1977, and "Unchained Melody" b/w "Softly As I Leave You" from February 1978, are also not included, although "Unchained Melody" is on the fifth disc, and versions of "My Way" and "Softly As I Leave You" are also on other discs in the set. Of the 23 American singles on these discs, 19 made the Top 40, with "The Wonder of You" and "Burning Love" also making the top ten. Included as well are four tracks issued at 45 rpm in Great Britain only: the top ten single "I Just Can't Help Believin" b/w "How the Web Was Woven", the A-side "Green Green Grass of Home", and "Loving Arms", the British flip side to "My Boy." In the U.S., both sides of the British "I Just Can't Help Believin single had appeared as two LP tracks on That's the Way It Is, "Loving Arms" on Good Times, and "Green Grass" on Today.

Discs three and four compile studio tracks from various albums, with ten previously unreleased recordings or alternate takes. All but five of the 23 tracks on disc three originate from a single series of sessions, held over four days during June 1970, at RCA Studio B in Nashville, Tennessee. Facsimiles of the albums That's the Way It Is and "Elvis Country" can be assembled from tracks on this box, with the bulk of the two albums on this disc.  Disc four continues highlights from 1971 through Presley's final studio session, at home in Graceland on October 30, 1976. It includes two songs by Bob Dylan, "I Shall Be Released" and "Don't Think Twice, It's All Right", and a master studio take of the Sinatra signature song, "My Way."

The fifth disc approximates a Presley stage show typical to the era, taken mostly from shows in 1970 and 1972, with 21 songs running to about an hour. Eleven of the concert tracks are previously unreleased, "Reconsider Baby" and "I'll Remember You" originating from the matinee show at Madison Square Garden issued later in 1997 on An Afternoon in the Garden. The disc does not open, as Presley shows often did, with the introduction to Strauss' tone poem Also sprach Zarathustra, played by the backing orchestra to announce the entrance of Elvis. The rock and roll instrumental support consists of the TCB Band, in addition to Presley's usual coterie of back-up vocalists, and the orchestra led by Joe Guercio. The final five songs present a "rehearsal" for the show, deriving from informal recordings made at actual rehearsals at RCA Studios in Hollywood in preparation for Elvis: That's the Way It Is and for a summer 1974 engagement in Las Vegas.

RCA Records issued two similarly configured box set companions, one for the 1950s, and another for the 1960s, the former his complete known masters from that decade, and the latter set chronicling his non-soundtrack/non-gospel recordings from the second decade of his career. Additional two-disc sets featuring his complete gospel recordings and selections from his soundtracks were also issued under this series. Unlike the first two decades collections, however, the compilers of Walk a Mile in My Shoes chose not to collect every studio recording Presley made during his final decade, choosing to focus on the singles, a sampling of "studio highlights" and an example of his live work.

Professional studio recordings made at RCA Studio B in Nashville, RCA Studio C in Hollywood, Stax Studio in Memphis, and in the Jungle Room at Graceland. Live recordings from The International Hotel in Las Vegas, Madison Square Garden in New York City, the H.I.C. Arena in Honolulu, and the Crisler Arena in Ann Arbor, Michigan. Original recordings produced by Felton Jarvis. "Are You Sincere" recorded at Elvis' home in Palm Springs, California, and produced by Presley.

Purpose
After the success of his television special in 1968, the album From Elvis in Memphis and the chart-topping single "Suspicious Minds" in 1969, Presley stopped making motion pictures, which had become central to his public identity in the 1960s, and concentrated on making music. During the course of the 1970s, in addition to the aforementioned singles, 41 Presley albums appeared in the U.S. prior to his death: seven new compilations from RCA, including The Sun Sessions; nine compilations on the budget RCA Camden label, including an altered reissue of the 1957 Christmas album; two additional compilations on the bargain-bin Pickwick label; four more reissues; six concert documents, including Having Fun with Elvis on Stage and the posthumous Elvis in Concert; and thirteen original albums of new material, with one Christmas LP and one gospel LP among them.

As seen from the chart positions in the discography, public reaction to Presley's output during this period was mixed, in part owing to the sheer volume of released items. Unlike the fifties box, Walk a Mile in My Shoes cherry-picks the material in three sections – commercial singles, choice album cuts, and live performance. Winnowing down the selections argues for the continued vitality of Presley's work in this period. As stated by Marsh in the liner notes:
Elvis' Seventies music has been picked at and picked over, issued and reissued, discussed, dissected, distorted, displayed, and dismissed. But it's only now, gathered into one place, that it kind of makes you gulp a bit to realize how productive he was in the last six years of his life...Certainly, Elvis' albums lack the structural integrity of some other artists recording in this period – which is one reason a box set such as this can in fact present a clearer picture of his music than weeding through all his discs one by one.

Track listing
Chart positions for albums from the Billboard 200; positions for singles from the Billboard Hot 100, except where noted. Certain tracks listed as unreleased on the insert card of the jewel cases are unedited masters of issued tracks, or without later overdubs; those are indicated with an asterisk and listed with the original issue information for the released master.

Disc one: The Singles

Disc two: The Singles

Disc three: Studio Highlights 1970–1971

Disc four: Studio Highlights 1971–1976

Disc five: The Elvis Presley Show

Personnel

 Elvis Presley – vocals, guitar, piano
 James Burton – guitar
 John Wilkinson – guitar
 Charlie Hodge – guitar, backing vocals
 Chip Young – guitar
 Reggie Young – guitar
 Eddie Hinton – guitar
 Dennis Linde – guitar
 Glen Hardin – piano
 David Briggs – keyboards
 Charlie McCoy – organ, harmonica
 Bobby Wood – piano
 Bobby Emmons – organ
 Tony Brown – keyboards
 Pete Hallin – keyboards
 Greg Gordon – clavinet
 Don Sumner – piano
 Norbert Putnam – bass
 Bob Lanning – bass
 Jerry Scheff – bass
 Emory Gordy – bass
 Tommy Cogbill – bass
 Duke Bardwell – bass
 Thomas Hensley – bass
 Ronnie Tutt – drums
 Jerry Carrigan – drums
 Bob Lanning – drums
 Kenny Buttrey – drums
 Farrell Morris – percussion
 Weldon Myrick – pedal steel guitar
 Bobby Thompson – banjo
 Buddy Spicher – fiddle
 J.D. Sumner & The Stamps – backing vocals
 Kathy Westmoreland – backing vocals
 The Imperials – backing vocals
 The Sweet Inspirations – backing vocals
 The Jordanaires – backing vocals
 The Nashville Edition – backing vocals
 Millie Kirkham – backing vocals
 Mary Holladay – backing vocals
 Ginger Holladay – backing vocals
 June Page – backing vocals
 Sonja Montgomery – backing vocals
 Dolores Edgin – backing vocals
 Mary Greene – backing vocals
 Susan Pilkinton – backing vocals
 Myrna Smith – backing vocals
 Sherrill Nielsen – backing vocals
 Temple Riser- backing vocals

References

Elvis Presley compilation albums
1995 compilation albums
RCA Records compilation albums
Compilation albums published posthumously